is a Japanese actor, voice actor and singer, famous for his role as Ryo Shishido in the Prince of Tennis Musicals. He was hospitalized on April 21, 2007, and was unable to play the role of Minami Itsuki in Musical Air Gear vs. Bacchus Super Range Remix and appear in Dream Live 4 ~Extra~. As he mentioned in his blog, as of February 2008 he is completely recovered and will start working again. He is the leader and lead vocals for the rock band Cocoa Otoko that debuted on 2010, yet disbanded again.

Stage performances 

 THE BUSAIKU (2005)
 Tenimyu: The Imperial Match Hyotei Gakuen (2005) as Shishido Ryou
 Tenimyu: The Imperial Match Hyotei Gakuen in winter (2005–2006) as Shishido Ryou
 Tenimyu: Dream Live 3rd (2006) as Shishido Ryou
 Tenimyu: Advancement Match Rokkaku feat. Hyotei Gakuen (2006) as Shishido Ryou
 Musical Air Gear (2007/01/7-14, 2007/01/19-21) as Minami Itsuki
 Tenimyu: The Imperial Presence Hyotei Gakuen feat. Higachuu (2008) as Shishido Ryou
 Musical Air Gear Musical Air Gear vs. Bacchus Top Gear Remix (2010) as Minami Itsuki
 SHOW BY ROCK!! Live Musical "SHOW BY ROCK!!" ~THE FES II-Thousand XVII~ and (2017) as Shu☆Zo
 MORIARTY THE PATRIOT: MUSICAL MORIARTY THE PATRIOT (2019) as John H. Watson
 Hyper Projection Engeki: Haikyu!! (2019-2021) as Ittetsu Takeda
 MORIARTY THE PATRIOT: MUSICAL MORIARTY THE PATRIOT Op.2 A SCANDAL IN BRITISH EMPIRE (2020) as John H. Watson
 MORIARTY THE PATRIOT: MUSICAL MORIARTY THE PATRIOT Op.3 The Phantom of Whitechapel (2021) as John H. Watson

Movies 

 The Prince of Tennis (film): brief appearance as Sasabe's Friend
 Arakure Knight (2007)
 Shinjukuku Kabukichou Hoikuen (2009)

TV Dramas 

 Tsubasa no Oreta Tenshitachi (Fuji TV, 2006) cameo
 Princess Princess D (TV Asahi, 2006) as Mikoto Yutaka
 Happy Boys (Avex Entertainment, 2007) as Akasaka Junta
 Oretachi wa Tenshi da! No Angel No Luck (TV Tokyo, 2009) as Darts
 Heaven's Rock (KTV, 2010) as Teppei
 Hanawake no Yon shimai (TBS, 2011)

Anime television 

 Air Gear - voice of Minami Itsuki
 Katekyo Hitman Reborn! - season one voice of Dino Cavallone
 Holy Talker - voice of Takayama Renga
 Lovely Complex - voice of Kohori Kazuki
 My Hero Academia - voice of Edgeshot (Shinya Kamihara)

Radio Show 

 MabeRadio with Kazuki Kato and Chieko Higuchi
 Maberaji W with Renn Kiriyama and Chieko Higuchi
 KiraKira Radio (Web Radio)

External links 
  Official blog 

1984 births
Living people
Japanese male musical theatre actors
Japanese male singers
Japanese male video game actors
Japanese male voice actors
Japanese television personalities
Male actors from Osaka Prefecture
Male voice actors from Osaka Prefecture
Musicians from Osaka Prefecture